is a TV series broadcast in Japan by Fuji TV. It is the sequel to Team Batista no Eiko and General Rouge no Gaisen.

Cast
 Atsushi Itō as Kōhei Taguchi
 Tōru Nakamura as Keisuke Shiratori
 Katsunori Takahashi as Yoshimasa Ikaruga
 Manami Konishi as Sumire Sasai
 Toshinori Omi as Joichiro Kitayama 
 Seiji Fukushi as Soichi Usami
 Yasuhi Nakamura as Makoto Tamamura
 Ken Yasuda as Goro Shimazu
 Tomohiro Ichikawa as Shuusuke Suga
 Go Riju as Daisuke Mifune
 Yuko Natori as Makoto Fujiwara
 Ryuzo Hayashi as Gonta Takashina
 Jinta Nishizawa as Hiroki Kanda
 Toshihiro Yashiba – Yuichi Tomono
 Naomasa Musaka – Yukio Matsuzaki
 Kenta Satoi – Yagami

Guest appearances
 Kazumasa Taguchi – Kiyohara Masao (ep1)
 Hideo Ishiguro – Kiyohara Shinichi (ep1)
 Michiko Ameku – Ichiko Taniguchi (ep2)
 Yasuhito Hida – Katsuya Oda (ep2)
 Yasuyuki Maekawa – Coroner (ep2)
 Etsuko Seki – Shizue Taniguchi (ep2)
 Daikichi Sugawara – Takahiro Nakano (ep4)
 Toshihide Tonesaku – Shuichi Kojima (ep4)
 Aki Nishihara – Misa Sugiyama (ep4)
 Sanae Miyata – Tomoko Sugiyama (ep4)
 Kayo Ise – Kaori Miyata (ep4)
 Senji Takeuchi – Kazuo Sugiyama (ep4)
 Hajime Okayama – Dr.Nojima (ep7)
 Ai Kato – Haruka Izumi (ep8)
 Takayuki Kinoshita (TKO) – Shinji Sato (ep8)
 Masahiro Komoto – Etsuro Ino (ep8-9)
 Takeshi Masu – Ken Ozaki (ep8-9)
 Chiemi Toi –   Yuka Mitani (ep8-9)
 Isamu Ichikawa – Prof. Yamaoka  (ep9)

Episode information

References

External links
  

Japanese drama television series